Atilio Ceferino García Pérez (26 August 1914 – 12 December 1973) was an Argentine born Uruguayan naturalized footballer who played as a forward.

Gaecía is the top goal scorer in the history of Uruguayan football with 465 goals scored in official tournaments and the second highest goal scorer in the history of the Uruguayan Football Championship with 208 goals scored in 210 matches, which also converted him in to the top goal scorer of the Uruguayan Championship playing for the same club. He is also the top scorer in the history of Uruguayan Clásico with 35 goals. He played for Nacional between 1938 and 1951.

Career
García had short spells with Club Atlético Moreno, Club Atlético Platense and Boca Juniors in Argentina before joining Nacional.

With Nacional he set a number of national records, including; Most topscorer awards, most consecutive top scorer awards, most goals against C.A. Peñarol and the most goals against Peñarol in a single game. During his time at Nacional the club won 25 titles, including eight championships. García was the top scorer in the league on eight occasions.

After leaving Nacional he had single seasons with Racing Club de Montevideo and Miramar Misiones.

García continued to live in Uruguay after his retirement in 1953. He died in Montevideo in 1973.

Career statistics

International

Scores and results list Uruguay's goal tally first, score column indicates score after each García goal.

Honours

 Primera División (8): 1939, 1940, 1941, 1942, 1943, 1946, 1947, 1950
 Torneo de Honor (8): 1938, 1939, 1940, 1941, 1942, 1943, 1946, 1948
Campeonato Nocturno Rioplatense (1): 1938
 C. C. Grandes del Río de la Plata (1): 1938
 Copa Aldao (3): 1940, 1942, 1946
 Torneo Competencia (3): 1942, 1945, 1948
 Copa del Atlántico (1): 1947

Top scorer statistics

Facts
 Atilio Ceferino García has a stand in the Estadio Gran Parque Central named in his honour.
 On 8 December 1940 García scored a record 4 goals in a 5–1 victory over Peñarol.
 García scored a total of 35 goals against Peñarol, a record that may never be surpassed.
 García was topscorer in Uruguay in seven consecutive seasons between 1938 and 1944.
 Fernando Morena is the only player to have scored more goals than García in the Uruguayan league, with 230.
 García is the top scorer in the history of Club Nacional de Football, with 464 goals in 435 games in all competitions.

References

External links
  Biography on the Nacional website
  

1914 births
1973 deaths
People from Junín, Buenos Aires
Sportspeople from Buenos Aires Province
Argentine emigrants to Uruguay
Argentine footballers
Uruguayan footballers
Uruguay international footballers
Association football forwards
Club Atlético Platense footballers
Boca Juniors footballers
Club Nacional de Football players
Racing Club de Montevideo players
Miramar Misiones players
Uruguayan Primera División players
Argentine Primera División players
Expatriate footballers in Uruguay
Naturalized citizens of Uruguay